"Qui peut vivre sans amour?" (meaning "Who Can Live Without Love?") is a song recorded by Canadian singer Celine Dion, released as the third single from her French-language album, Sans attendre (2012). It was written by Elodie Hesme and David Gategno, and produced by Julien Schultheis and Gategno. "Qui peut vivre sans amour?" received generally favorable reviews from music critics, who called it an orchestral rock power ballad. The well-received music video for the song premiered on 19 April 2013.

Background and release
The lyrics and thirty-second previews of all songs from Sans attendre were posted on Dion's official website on 18 October 2012. "Qui peut vivre sans amour?" became available as a digital download from the album on the day that Sans attendre was released. On 10 February 2013, celinedion.com announced that it was chosen as the third single. On 8 March 2013, the promotional single cover art created by the illustrator Aurore Hutton, niece of former French President Valéry Giscard d'Estaing was revealed and the single was sent to radio in France. In Quebec, "Qui peut vivre sans amour?" was released to radio stations on 18 March 2013. The promotional single contains a new version of the song with less guitar and more piano and strings. It makes the song "softer" but still "powerful".

Composition
The song was written by Elodie Hesme and David Gategno, while the production was handled by Julien Schultheis and Gategno. Elodie Hesme worked with Dion for the first time and wrote the lyrics to three songs from Sans attendre: "Qui peut vivre sans amour?," "Attendre" and "Si je n'ai rien de toi". David Gategno already collaborated with Dion on D'elles in 2007, including composing and producing her French number-one single, "Et s'il n'en restait qu'une (je serais celle-là)". On Sans attendre he composed and produced four tracks: "Qui peut vivre sans amour?," "Attendre," "La mer et l'enfant" and "Si je n'ai rien de toi". Julien Schultheis worked with Dion for the first time, producing "Qui peut vivre sans amour?" and playing instruments on it, and also on "Attendre" and "Si je n'ai rien de toi". In "Qui peut vivre sans amour?", Dion "takes a dramatic tone revealing a darker side" and asks who can live without love, knowing that it can at times cause pain and suffering. Dion "overwhelms the worst evils" in the song: if love is a "plague", a "criminal" and causes the most disastrous "wars," it also governs our lives and is the source of our dreams. The track features Paris Pop Orchestra conducted by Stanislas.

Critical reception
The song received generally positive reviews from music critics. Łukasz Mantiuk from All About Music called it strong and feisty and chose it as the best track on Sans attendre. Lea Hermann from Focus wrote that "Qui peut vivre sans amour?" is a rock inspired, drums driven, dramatic song that stands out on the album. Paula Haddad from Music Story praised the production of the track and Darryl Sterdan from Ottawa Sun mentioned "Qui peut vivre sans amour?" as a song worth downloading from Sans attendre. Alain de Repentigny from La Presse called it an orchestral rock power ballad. He praised the fact that Dion is "biting" into a rock song but he felt that the guitar solo a little dated. According to Jonathan Hamard from Pure Charts, "Qui peut vivre sans amour?" is the only truly dynamic song on the album and it has an effective chorus. He also called it "punchy" and "electric". Marty Tobin from Quai Baco wrote that "Qui peut vivre sans amour?" is a "Celine Dion rock song" with a little saturated guitar in the chorus and many layers of violins which makes it closer to Mozart, l'opéra rock than "Killed by Death" by Motörhead. According to Evous France, "Qui peut vivre sans amour?" is a rock ballad with an energetic vocal, a little similar to "Et s'il n'en restait qu'une (je serais celle-là)". Geneviève Bouchard from La Presse criticized the track because of the rock sounds which dominated the song and Bernard Perusse from The Gazette called it a "quasi-arena-rock showcase" with a "strangely abrasive, tuneless chorus". After the single "Qui peut vivre sans amour?" was announced, Evous France criticized this choice, preferring the release of "Je n'ai pas besoin d'amour," "Une chance qu'on s'a," "Celle qui m'a tout appris" or "L'amour peut prendre froid".

Commercial performance
"Qui peut vivre sans amour?" debuted on the Canadian Adult Contemporary Chart in late March 2013 and on the Belgian Wallonia Ultratip Chart in mid-April 2013. The song peaked at number twelve on the Belgian Wallonia Ultratip Chart and number forty-one on the Canadian Adult Contemporary Chart. In Quebec, it peaked at number seven.

Music video
The music video for "Qui peut vivre sans amour?" was directed by Thierry Vergnes and filmed in Las Vegas on 18 March 2013. Vergnes already directed clips for two previous singles form Sans attendre: "Parler à mon père" and "Le miracle". The video for "Qui peut vivre sans amour?" premiered on 19 April 2013. It received positive reviews from music critics who noted that the video is better than the previous two from Sans attendre. It shows several pairs of dancers who, through choreography, mimic different situations that lovers may face one day.

Live performances
Dion performed the song during two French television specials: Céline Dion, Le grand show on 24 November 2012 and We Love Céline on 20 December 2012.  The song was also performed during the Céline... une seule fois concert in Quebec City on 27 July 2013, as well as the Sans attendre Tour later that year; the former performance was included in the Céline une seule fois / Live 2013 CD/DVD. Celine Dion also performed this song during her Summer Tour 2016.

Track listing and formats
French promotional CD single
"Qui peut vivre sans amour?" (Radio Edit) – 3:23

Charts

Credits and personnel
Recording
Agathe' Studios and Omega Studios
Dion's vocal recorded at Echo Beach Studios, Jupiter, Florida

Personnel

songwriting – Elodie Hesme (lyrics), David Gategno (music)
production – Julien Schultheis, David Gategno
recording – David Gategno, Stephane Levy-b
vocal recording – François Lalonde
recording assistant – Ray Holznecht
mixing – Stephane Levy-b
keabords and programming – Julien Schultheis, David Gategno
piano – Julien Schultheis
bass – Zizou Sadki
drums – Julien Schultheis
guitars – Michel Aymé
strings and horns arrangement – Julien Schultheis
orchestra – Paris Pop Orchestra
conductor – Stanislas
horn – Jean Michel Tavernier

Release history

References

2012 songs
2013 singles
Celine Dion songs
French-language songs